State Highway 80 is a north–south state highway in eastern Oklahoma. It runs from Fort Gibson in Muskogee County to Hulbert in Cherokee County.

Route description
SH-80 begins at US-62/SH-10 just south of Fort Gibson. After heading through Fort Gibson, it enters Cherokee County. It roughly parallels the Cherokee/Wagoner County line before meeting the east end of State Highway 251A. It then heads east before curving back north and zig-zagging to its northern end with SH-51.

The route is known for its winding curves as it traverses the eastern shores of Fort Gibson Lake and is popular among motorcyclists.

Junction list

SH-80A

SH-80A is an alternate route of SH-80 through the east side of Fort Gibson.

References

External links
SH-80 at Roadklahoma
SH-80A at Roadklahoma

080
Transportation in Muskogee County, Oklahoma
Transportation in Cherokee County, Oklahoma